Luigi Lusi (Rome, 25 November 1961) is an Italian politician, lawyer and Senator. He was the treasurer of The Daisy from 2001 to 2007 and a member of the Democratic Party from 2007 to 2012.

Indictment
On 31 January 2012 Lusi was indicted for allegedly taking the sum of €13 million owned by his former party, The Daisy, and using it for personal purposes. On 6 February 2012 he was expelled from the Democratic Party for being "incompatible with the core principles of the Party".

References

External links
Official website
Senate page

1961 births
Living people
Politicians from Rome
Members of the Senate of the Republic (Italy)
Democratic Party (Italy) politicians
21st-century Italian politicians
Democracy is Freedom – The Daisy politicians